The Conmhaícne Cúile or Conmaicne Cuile Tolad were an early people of Ireland. Their tuath comprised, at minimum, most of the barony of Kilmaine, in County Mayo.

Origin
The Conmhaicne or Conmaicne were a people of early Ireland, perhaps related to the Laigin, who dispersed to various parts of Ireland. They settled in Connacht and Longford, giving their name to several Conmaicne territories. Other branches of Conmaicne were located in County Galway, Roscommon, Mayo, and Leitrim.

Cuile means woods or forest. Ruaidhrí Ó Flaithbheartaigh linked "Cúile" with Cullagh townland ("An Choilleach", the woods). ("plain of a lament") is the place where the 1st battle of Moytura was fought. Tuiredh translates as "a lament". Some Latin texts reference them as "Conmacgneculy" and "Conmacniculy".

Territory

Knox said their territory comprised the baronies Ross and much of Kilmaine (except parts east, and north of the Robe). East Kilmaine was occupied by the Muinter Crechain. To the north was "Maigh Ceara", now the barony of Carra, County Mayo.

The alternative name for the barony of Kilmaine, Coolagh, probably reflects the ancient population group named Conmaicne Cuile. Their territory was bounded by lakes, and native Irish forests in places.

Septs
The chief Conmaicne Cuile family was Ó Talcharain. The primary septs were:-

 Ó Talcharain, Ó Talcharan.
 Ó Morann (Moran)
 Ó Martain (Martin or Martins)

Conmaicne Cuile Tolad was invaded by Anglo-Normans about the middle of the thirteenth century, and granted to Maurice Fitzgerald. Another deed calls the district the cantred of 'Keneloch', probably Kinlough north-east of Moyne, a chief manor of the area. In later times the Burkes controlled the territory.

Patrican churches
In the original Vita tripartita Sancti Patricii, Tírechán said Saint Patrick travelled through Conmaicne Dunmore to Conmaicne Cuile Tolad and established Christian churches here. Knox identified these new churches as Kilmaine-beg, Shrule, and perhaps the Church of Cross. Earlier Patrician churches already existed at Kilmainemore, Kilbennan, Donaghpatrick, and perhaps Templepatrick at "Inchanguill".

See also
 Conmhaicne
 Conmaicne Carra
 Cath Maige Tuired

References

Secondary sources

 
 
 
 A Chorographical Description of West or H-Iar Connaught written A.D. 1684 by Roderic O'Flaherty ESQ with notes and Illustrations by, James Hardiman M.R.I.A., Irish Archaeological Society, 1846.
 
 
 
 

History of County Mayo
Historical ethnic groups of Europe
Ethnic groups in Ireland
Gaelic-Irish nations and dynasties
Conmaicne Cuile Toladh